Trailin' Trouble is a 1937 American Western film directed by Arthur Rosson and starring Ken Maynard, Lona Andre, and Roger Williams. It was released on November 12, 1937. During production its working title was Alias Blackie Burke.

Plot

Cast
 Ken Maynard as John "Friendly" Fields and Blackie Burke
 Lona Andre as Patty Blair
 Roger Williams as Tom Crocker
 Fred Burns as Sheriff Jake Jones
 Phil Dunham as Nester
 Marin Sais as Mrs. Burns
 Tarzan as Himself
 Grace Wood as Mrs. Dunn

References

External links
 
 

American Western (genre) films
1937 Western (genre) films
1937 films
American black-and-white films
Films directed by Arthur Rosson
Grand National Films films
1930s American films